King or Queen of Ireland is a title of the British monarchy in the island of Ireland.

Queen of Ireland or The Queen of Ireland may also refer to:

 Our Lady, Queen of Ireland, the Blessed Virgin Mary at Knock Shrine, Ireland
The Queen of Ireland, 2015 Irish documentary film about drag artist "Panti", Rory O'Neill
The Queen of Ireland: An Historical Account of Ireland's Devotion to the Blessed Virgin, a 1938 book by Helena Concannon
The Queen of Ireland, a 1960 radio play by James Hanley